Operation Nemesis was a program to assassinate both Ottoman perpetrators of the Armenian genocide and officials of the Azerbaijan Democratic Republic responsible for the massacre of Armenians during the September Days of 1918 in Baku. Masterminded by Shahan Natalie, Armen Garo, and Aaron Sachaklian, it was named after the Greek goddess of divine retribution, Nemesis.

Between 1920 and 1922, a clandestine cell of the Armenian Revolutionary Federation carried out seven killings, the best-known being the assassination of Talaat Pasha, the main orchestrator of the Armenian genocide, by Armenian Soghomon Tehlirian in March 1921 in Berlin.

Background

The Armenian Revolutionary Federation (ARF) was active within the Ottoman Empire in the early 1890s with the aim of unifying the various small groups in the empire who advocated for reform and a certain degree of autonomy within the empire. ARF members formed fedayi guerrilla groups that helped organize the self-defense of Armenian civilians. In July–August 1914, the 8th congress of the ARF was a watershed event. Members of the Committee of Union and Progress requested assistance from the party in the conquest of Transcaucasia by inciting a rebellion of Russian Armenians against the Russian army in the event of a Caucasus Campaign opening up. The Armenians agreed to remain loyal to their government, but declared their inability to agree to the other proposal.

Prominent ARF members were among the Armenian intellectuals targeted on April 24, 1915 in Constantinople. The arrested people were moved to two holding centers near Ankara under Interior Minister Mehmed Talat's order on April 24, 1915, and mostly deported and killed.

In 1919, after the Armistice of Mudros, Turkish courts-martial were convened in Constantinople, during which some of the principal perpetrators of the Armenian genocide were convicted and sentenced to death. The UK seized some of the perpetrators from the Ottoman authorities in several of Istanbul's prisons, after their incompetency in failing to hold fair trials, and transported them to the British colony of Malta. There, the Malta exiles (so-called by Turkish sources) were, after Mustafa Kemal Atatürk's incarceration of Lord Curzon's relative, exchanged for British subjects detained by the Turkish government of Atatürk. Since there were no international laws in place under which they could be tried, the men who orchestrated the genocide travelled relatively freely throughout Germany, Italy, and Central Asia.

Congress in Yerevan 
On May 28, 1918, the Armenian National Council, a group of professionals based in Tiflis, declared the independence of the First Republic of Armenia. Hovhannes Kachaznuni and Alexander Khatisyan, both members of the ARF, moved to Yerevan to seize power and issued the official announcement of Armenian independence on May 30, 1918. Yerevan became the capital city of Armenia. At this city, from September 27 to the end of October 1919, the ARF's 9th General Congress convened.

The issue of justice against those responsible for the Armenian genocide was on the agenda of the congress.  Over many of the Russian Armenian delegates' vociferous objections, it was decided to mete out justice through armed force. ARF Bureau members, specifically Simon Vratsyan, Ruben Ter Minasian and Ruben Darbinian, opposed Shahan Natalie's operation. However, a "black list" was created, containing the names of 200 persons deemed most responsible for organizing the genocide against the Armenian people.

Operation 

The leader of the group responsible for the task was Shahan Natalie, working with Grigor Merjanov. For Natalie, the primary target was Talaat Pasha, whom Shahan called "Number One". The mission to kill Talaat was entrusted to Soghomon Tehlirian. Natalie's aim was to turn Tehlirian's trial into the political trial of those responsible for the Armenian genocide. In his memoirs, Natalie revealed his orders to Tehlirian: "you blow up the skull of the Number One nation-murderer and you don't try to flee. You stand there, your foot on the corpse and surrender to the police, who will come and handcuff you."

Aftermath 
After the Sovietization of Armenia, many of the First Armenian Republic's expatriate revolutionary activists did not hesitate to collaborate with Azeri and Turk Armenophobe activists to regain governmental control. This policy was contrary to Shahan Natalie's conviction that "Over and above the Turk, the Armenian has no enemy, and Armenian revenge is just and godly". There was deep dissent on both sides, but not yet to the point of separation. To forestall the probable victory of these "freedom fighters" at the upcoming 11th General Congress of the ARF (27 March to 2 May 1929), on the eve of the meeting, the Bureau began a "cleansing campaign". The first to be "removed" from the party was Bureau member Shahan Natalie. "Knowingly" (by his definition) having joined the ARF and unjustly separated from it, Shahan Natalie wrote about this: "With Shahan began again that which had begun with Antranig; Bureau member, Shahan, was 'ousted'." After Shahan were successively ousted Haig Kntouni, Glejian and Tartizian with their partisans, General Smbad, Ferrahian with his group, future "Mardgots" (Bastion)-ists Mgrdich Yeretziants, Levon Mozian, Vazgen Shoushanian, Mesrob Kouyoumjian, Levon Kevonian and many others. As a protest to this "cleansing" by the Bureau, some members of the ARF French Central Committee also resigned.

On 31 May 1926, the Turkish government passed Law Number 882, which assigned property to the relatives of Ottoman leaders assassinated for their role in the Armenian genocide. This law covered the families of important CUP members such as Talaat Pasha, Ahmet Cemal Pasha, Said Halim Pasha and Behaeddin Shakir, amongst others. The regulations within the law defined that they would be allocated property belonging to "fugitive Armenians". MP Recep Zühtü Soyak, a loyal follower and private secretary of Atatürk mentioned this new law was a strong "warning message to assassins: you may execute a Turk through an assassination! But, we will raise his offspring with your money so that tomorrow, he will gouge out your eye and break your head." Among those of those marked for assassination was Enver Pasha (killed 1922 in battle with the Soviets) and Abdülhalik Renda became President of Turkey and died in 1957.

List of assassinations
Assassinations performed under Operation Nemesis include:

See also
Nakam, a postwar Jewish militia that conducted multiple assassination attempts against Nazi prisoners in response to the Holocaust 
Operation Wrath of God, conducted by Israel in response to the Munich massacre

References

Further reading

External links
 Detailed story of Special Operation
 http://www.operationnemesis.com

Conflicts in 1920
Conflicts in 1921
Conflicts in 1922
Aftermath of the Armenian genocide
Assassination campaigns
Operations involving special forces
Covert operations